Different uses of Dankali include:

 Dankali, Cameroon, a location in Adamawa Province, Cameroon
 Dankali, a name for the Afar people and/or their language
 Dänkali (or Denkalia), a former province of Eritrea